Ralph Moody (November 5, 1886 – September 6, 1971 ) was an American actor with over 50 movie and over 100 television appearances, plus numerous radio appearances.

Moody spent more than four decades working in stock theater throughout the United States, including having his own troupe for almost half of that span.

In 1939, he began working in radio at WIBW in Topeka, Kansas. Later, he became an announcer and actor at WLW radio in Cincinnati, Ohio. Moody was a regular on radio broadcasts of Gunsmoke and Dragnet, and also performed on the Roy Rogers Show, Wild Bill Hickok, and X Minus One. He portrayed Gramps on The Trouble with the Truitts on NBC Rado.

At the age of 62, Moody began a string of film and television appearances, including films such as Road to Bali, Toward the Unknown, The Legend of Tom Dooley,  and The Story of Ruth.

On television, he played Jay Burrage in The Rifleman. He was also seen in episodes of Gunsmoke, The Lone Ranger, Circus Boy, Mr. Adams and Eve, Perry Mason, Bonanza, Have Gun – Will Travel, Rawhide, Daniel Boone, Wanted Dead or Alive, Wagon Train, Rescue 8, and The Adventures of Rin Tin Tin. He was also among a rotation of actors used by Jack Webb in the 1950s version, as well as the 1967–70 revival of Dragnet, and in 1970 appeared in the last Dragnet episode produced by Webb. His most frequent television roles were as a kindly old man or Native American.

Filmography

References

External links 
 
 

1886 births
1971 deaths
20th-century American male actors
American male film actors
American male radio actors
American male stage actors
American male television actors
Western (genre) television actors